Per Flagellum Sanguemque, Tenebras Veneramus (Latin for With Blood and Whip, We Worship the Dark) is the sixth full-length studio album by Gnaw Their Tongues, released on November 8, 2011 by Crucial Blast. The album saw a return to the more direct and aggressive sound of Gnaw Their Tongues' earlier work, which contrasts the more polished and lighter toned L'arrivée de la terne mort triomphante released the previous year.

Track listing

Personnel
Adapted from the Per Flagellum Sanguemque, Tenebras Veneramus liner notes.
 Maurice de Jong (as Mories) – vocals, instruments, recording, mixing, mastering, cover art

Release history

References

External links 
 
 Per Flagellum Sanguemque, Tenebras Veneramus at Bandcamp

2011 albums
Gnaw Their Tongues albums